Alexis Cabrera (born March 18, 1987 in Buenos Aires, Argentina) is an Argentine footballer currently playing for Sportivo Rivadavia of the Torneo Argentino B.

Teams
  Lanús 2005-2007
  San Martín de Mendoza 2008-2009
  Deportes Naval 2009-2010
  Deportes La Serena 2010-2011
  Almagro 2011-2012
  Ferroviarios 2012-2013
  Sportivo Rivadavia 2014–present

References

External links
Profile

1987 births
Living people
Argentine footballers
Argentine expatriate footballers
Club Atlético Lanús footballers
San Martín de Mendoza footballers
Naval de Talcahuano footballers
Deportes La Serena footballers
Club Almagro players
Expatriate footballers in Chile
Expatriate footballers in Ecuador
Pan American Games medalists in football
Pan American Games gold medalists for Argentina
Association football midfielders
Footballers at the 2003 Pan American Games
Medalists at the 2003 Pan American Games
Footballers from Buenos Aires